A general election was held in the U.S. state of Idaho on November 4, 2014. All of Idaho's executive officers are up for election as well as a United States Senate seat, and both of Idaho's two seats in the United States House of Representatives. Primary elections was held on May 20, 2014.

Governor

Incumbent Republican Governor Butch Otter ran for re-election to a third term in office

He was challenged in the Republican primary by State Senator Russ Fulcher, defeating him 51% to 44%. Perennial candidate Walt Bayes and candidate for Idaho's 1st congressional district in 2000 and 2010 and candidate for Mayor of Boise in 2001 Harley Brown took 2% and 3%, respectively.

A.J. Balukoff, a businessman and President of the Boise School District Board of Trustees comfortably defeated Terry Kerr, a former Republican candidate for local office, for the Democratic nomination.

Lieutenant Governor

Incumbent Republican Lieutenant Governor Brad Little ran for re-election to a second term in office.

He was challenged in the Republican primary by Idaho County Commissioner Jim Chmelik.

Former State Senator and candidate for Superintendent of Public Instruction in 2006 Bert Marley was unopposed for the Democratic nomination.

David Hartigan ran for the Constitution Party.

Polling

Attorney General

Incumbent Republican Attorney General Lawrence Wasden ran for re-election to a fourth term in office. He was challenged in the Republican primary by attorney C.T. "Chris" Troupis.

Attorney Bruce Bistline was unopposed for the Democratic nomination.

Polling

Secretary of State

Incumbent Republican Secretary of State Ben Ysursa did not run for re-election to a fourth term in office.

Four Republicans ran for their party's nomination: former Speaker of the Idaho House of Representatives Lawerence Denney, former State Senator Evan Frasure, Ada County Chief Deputy Clerk Phil McGrane and former State Senator Mitch Toryanski. State Senator Marv Hagedorn and State Representative Luke Malek had considered running in the Republican primary, but decided against it.

State Representative Holli Woodings ran for the Democrats and was unopposed in her party's primary.

Polling

Treasurer

Incumbent Republican State Treasurer Ron Crane is running for re-election to a fifth term in office. He was unopposed in the Republican primary.

Chairwoman of the Twin Falls County Democrats Deborah Silver and Green Party nominee for Nevada's 1st congressional district in 2002 W. Lane Startin ran for the Democratic nomination.

Polling

Controller
Incumbent Republican Controller Brandon D. Woolf, who was appointed to the position in 2012 after Donna Jones resigned after suffering injuries in a car crash, ran for election to a first full term. He was challenged in the Republican primary by former Vice Chairman of the Idaho Republican Party and candidate for Controller in 2010 Todd Hatfield.

No Democrat filed to run for the office.

Superintendent of Public Instruction

Incumbent Republican Superintendent of Public Instruction Tom Luna did not run for re-election to a third term in office.

Four Republicans ran for their party's nomination: teacher John Eynon, Melba School District Superintendent Andrew Grover, middle school principal Randy Jensen and high school principal Sherri Ybarra.

Former Chief Deputy Superintendent Roger Quarles, former State Representative Steve Smylie, former State Senator Melinda Smyser, State Representative Steven Thayn, State Representative Jeffrey Thompson and Gooding School District Superintendent Heather Williams had considered running in the Republican primary, but all decided against it.

Former Chief Deputy Superintendent and nominee for Superintendent in 2006 Jana Jones ran unopposed for the Democratic nomination.

Polling

United States Senate

Incumbent Republican Senator Jim Risch ran for re-election to a second term in office. He was challenged in the Republican primary by Jeremy Anderson, defeating him with almost 80% of the vote.

Attorney Nels Mitchell easily defeated attorney from New York and perennial candidate William Bryk for the Democratic nomination.

United States House of Representatives

Both of Idaho's two seats in the United States House of Representatives were up for election in 2014. Both incumbents, Raúl Labrador and Mike Simpson won re-election handily.

References

 
Idaho